KNBE (88.9 FM) is a radio station licensed to Beatrice, Nebraska, United States. The station is currently owned by Family Worship Center Church.

References

External links
 

NBE